Robert Underwood may refer to:

 Robert A. Underwood (born 1948), Guamanian politician and educator
 Robert Underwood (baseball) (1934–2011), baseball player
 Robert C. Underwood (1915–1988), American jurist